Narayanapuram is a neighbourhood in Kanchipuram district of Tamil Nadu state in peninsular India.

Narayanapuram Lake is a lake in the Narayanapuram area.

References 

Villages in Kanchipuram district